Wielton SA is a Polish manufacturer of tippers and tautliners for traction units. The company is the third biggest producer of semi-trailers in Europe and market leader in several countries of Central- and Eastern Europe as well as Central Asia.

History 
The predecessor company of Wielton was founded by two Polish engineers during the democratic transition of Poland. In the first years, the main object of business was to satisfy the growing demand for utility vehicles. In 1996 the company was restructured and started its own production line, ten years later it went public on the Warsaw Stock Exchange. Since 2012 the company operates a second assembly plant in Russia to serve the markets in the countries of the Commonwealth of Independent States.

Between 2014 and 2017 the company took over its competitors Italiana Rimorchi including the brands Cardi, Merker and Viberti in Italy, Fruehauf in United States, Langendorf in Germany and Lawrence David in the United Kingdom. The business group belonging to it, besides includes five further subsidiary firms in the sales, investment and logistics sector. In the Ivory Coast, the company established an assembly plant for the whole Economic Community of West African States.

Gallery

See also
Economy of Poland
List of Polish companies

External links 
 Homepage of the original brand

Truck manufacturers of Poland
Automotive companies of Poland
Polish brands
Vehicle manufacturing companies established in 1996
Trailer manufacturing companies
Polish companies established in 1996